The Centre for the History of the Book (CHB) was established in 1995 at The University of Edinburgh as an international and interdisciplinary centre for advanced research into all aspects of the material culture of the text - its production, circulation, and reception from manuscript to the electronic text.

Founded in 1995 by Bill Bell and Jonquil Bevan. Bell, who was director for almost two decades, was succeeded by Tom Mole. The CHB now serves a community over 30 members of staff across several university departments and is today an internationally recognised centre dedicated to the promotion of Bibliography and Book History.

As well as hosting international conferences and seminars, it provides a focus for a number of research projects, and facilitates postgraduate study in the field of the History of the Book.

Research 

The centre has been involved in a number of research projects.  These include the Edinburgh History of the Book in Scotland, a four-volume publication whose aim is to investigate the history of the production, circulation, and reception of Scottish texts from earliest times to the present.  The centre's director, Tom Mole, has edited The Broadview Book History Reader with Michelle Levy of Simon Fraser University. The reader reprints 33 key essays in the field, grouped conceptually and provided with headnotes, explanatory footnotes, an introduction, a chronology, and a glossary of terms.

Fellows 

The CHB regularly hosts visiting fellows from other universities.  Past fellows have included Richard Sher, Alexander Dick and others.

Events

Public Lectures 

The CHB hosts an annual public lecture, which at different times has been sponsored by James Thin Booksellers and Blackwell UK.  Past lecturers have included Asa Briggs, Lisa Jardine, Bamber Gascoigne, John Thompson, and Alberto Manguel.

Seminar Series 

The CHB hosts a seminar series, which runs bi-weekly during the University of Edinburgh term.

Conferences 

The CHB has organised a number of conferences, including the ‘Material Cultures’ conferences in 2000, 2005 and 2010, where keynote speakers included Robert Darnton, Stephen Greenblatt and Roger Chartier.  More recently, it has hosted some smaller conferences, including Creativity and Commerce in the Age of Print in 2014.  In 2015, it hosted a pair of symposia in collaboration with Harvard University, called Books and/as New Media.

Teaching 

The Centre provides training in Book History methods and approaches at all levels from undergraduate to postdoctoral.

Summer School 

The Centre runs a Summer School course called ‘Book History for Beginners’ through the University of Edinburgh's summer school programme. This course, taught in four modules on ‘print culture’, ‘material texts’, ‘publishing history’ and ‘the future of the book’, introduces students to the major debates in book history.

Master's Degree 

The Centre runs an MSc in Book History and Material Culture.  The programme comprises two core courses "Cultures of the Book" and "Working with Collections", plus an option course in each semester and the Research Methods course. The dissertation is researched and written over the summer.  Students also have the option of undertaking work placements as part of the degree.

Doctoral Training 

The centre received a grant in 2015 from the Scottish Graduate School for the Arts and Humanities to provide training workshops for doctoral students researching topics in the field of book history.  These workshops are run in collaboration with Stirling University and the University of Dundee.

Books and/as New Media 

In 2014, The Centre for the History of the Book won a grant from the College of Humanities and Social Sciences and the Institute for Advanced Study in the Humanities at the University of Edinburgh to foster new thinking about the history and future of the book.  The CHB collaborated with scholars at Harvard University, the Interacting with Print Research Group at McGill University and the Literary Lab at Stanford University, on a pair of twinned symposia called ‘Books and/as New Media’.  Speakers included Deidre Lynch, Anthony Grafton, Andrew Piper, Leah Price, and Kathryn Sutherland.

External links
 Centre for the History of the Book web site
 University of Edinburgh

University of Edinburgh
History of literature
1995 establishments in Scotland
History of books